The Score – An Epic Journey is a soundtrack album by the Dutch symphonic metal formation Epica, released in 2005. It is the film soundtrack to Joyride, a Dutch production.

Most of the songs of the album are instrumental, except for three songs. The three songs that do feature the singing voice of Simone Simons ("Trois Vierges", "Solitary Ground", "Quietus") are different versions of songs from the album Consign to Oblivion, which was released earlier the same year.

The album was originally supposed to be released on 8 September. After two delays, this date changed to 20 September 2005. The first samples of The Score were given to Jimmy Lim by Mark Jansen in Madrid.

Track listing

Personnel

Epica
Simone Simons – lead vocals
Mark Jansen – guitars, synths, orchestral arrangements
Ad Sluijter – guitars, acoustic guitar on "Beyond the Depth"
Coen Janssen – synths, orchestral arrangements
Yves Huts – bass guitar, synths, orchestral arrangements
Jeroen Simons – drums

Production
Miro – engineering, mixing, synths, orchestral arrangements
Olaf Reitmeier – engineering
Sascha Paeth – engineering and mixing on "Trois Vierges", "Solitary Ground" and "Quietus"
Philip Colodetti – engineering and mixing on "Trois Vierges", "Solitary Ground" and "Quietus"
Hans van Vuuren – executive producer, coordination and research
Sander van der Heide – mastering

Epica Orchestra
Benjamin Spillner – violin
Andreas Pfaff – violin
Tobias Rempe – violin
Gregor Dierk – violin
Swantje Tessman – viola
Patrick Sepec – viola
Astrid Müller – viola
Jörn Kellermann – cello

The Score Orchestra
Swantje Tessman – violin
Gregor Dierk – violin, solo violin
Tom Glöckner – violin
Barbara Bultmann – violin
Benjamin Spillner – violin
Marie-Therese Stumpf – viola
David Schlage – viola
Nikolaus Schlierf – viola
Alev Ackos – cello
James Bush – cello

References

Epica (band) albums
2005 soundtrack albums
Adventure film soundtracks